Beatrice Bulgari (née Bordoni) is an Italian costume designer, best known for designing the costumes for 1990's Cinema Paradiso.

She is married to the Italian billionaire Nicola Bulgari.

References

Bulgari family
Living people
Italian costume designers
Year of birth missing (living people)